Be Real with JR Digs is a 13-part Canadian television series which premiered on September 20, 2006, on TVtropolis. Produced by Mountain Road Productions, Be Real is the TV show that spontaneously turns regular people's ordinary lives into their very own reality TV show.

It is the ultimate in Reality TV - nothing planned, nothing scripted just a regular person, a director to guide them, and the day that lies ahead.

Synopsis
Be Real is the TV show that spontaneously turns regular people's ordinary lives into their very own reality TV show and it all happens in the spur of the moment. There's no script, no pre-production, not even a story idea. A random person is chosen to star in their own life for a day in front of a camera.

Host bio
For years, JR Digs wanted to star in his own network television show.  Determined to attain a level of stardom comparable to his childhood idol, Johnny Carson, and not sure of how to go about attaining any form of stardom, JR decided to buy it. In the summer of 2001, JR purchased air time and started his own brand of late night TV with a show called The JR Digs Show. The high cost eventually led JR into financial ruins.

Be Real is the culmination of JR's search for that elusive network deal. Ironically, after all those years of struggle, JR is now in the position to give others the chance to be stars and all they have to do is be in the right place at the right time!

Episodes

Awards

|-
| 2007
| Be Real with JR Digs
| Summit Awards (SIA), Category: Movie/Film Music Website
|  Gold
|-
| 2007
| Be Real with JR Digs
| Banff World Media Festival, Category: Hors Concours Selection for Reality Format Programs
| 
|-
| 2007
| Be Real with JR Digs
| Gemini Award, Category: Best Host in a Lifestyle/Practical Information, or Performing Arts Program or Series – JR Digs
| 
|-
|}

References

External links
 https://web.archive.org/web/20110722130243/http://www.berealtv.tv/
 http://www.mountainroad.ca/mrp/portfolio/be_real.php

2000s Canadian reality television series
2006 Canadian television series debuts
2006 Canadian television series endings